The 1998–99 Segunda División season saw 22 teams participate in the second flight Spanish league. Málaga CF, CD Numancia, Sevilla FC and Rayo Vallecano were promoted to Primera División. RCD Mallorca B, Barcelona B, Hércules CF and CD Ourense were relegated to Segunda División B.

Teams

Teams by Autonomous Community

Final table

Results

Promotion playoff

|}

First Leg

Second Leg 

Segunda División seasons
2
Spain